This is a list of German-language exonyms for places in Olsztyn County, Warmian-Masurian Voivodeship, Poland.

See also 
List of German exonyms for places in Poland
German exonyms (Warmia)

Olsztyn County
Olsztyn County